A Prayer Before Dawn may refer to:

 A Prayer Before Dawn (album)
 A Prayer Before Dawn (film)